Horfield Leisure Centre is a leisure centre in Horfield, Bristol, UK. It is one of the three most used leisure facilities in the Bristol City Council area, the other two being Hengrove Park Leisure Centre and Easton Leisure Centre.

History 
Work began to expand the facility in 2003. As part of the expansion, a swimming pool, fitness suite, creche, and cafe were added. The facility reopened on 14 November 2005 with an official opening by Darren Campbell on 18 November.

In July 2016, the centre reopened following a refurbishment. In December 2016, artificial turf pitches were opened at the site.

References 

Sports venues in Bristol
Swimming venues in England
Football venues in Bristol